The 1986–87 Iraqi National Clubs First Division was the 13th season of the competition since its foundation in 1974. Al-Rasheed won their first league title, and also won the 1986–87 Iraq FA Cup to complete the double. The league was played in a quadruple round-robin format for the only time in history.

League table

Results

Rounds 1–22

Rounds 23–44

Season statistics

Top scorers

Hat-tricks

References

External links
 Iraq Football Association

Iraqi Premier League seasons
1986–87 in Iraqi football
Iraq